Vana-Kariste is a village in Mulgi Parish, Viljandi County, in southern Estonia. It has a population of 95 (as of 1 January 2000).

Estonian Army officer Jaan Maide (1896–1945) was born in Vana-Kariste.

References

Villages in Viljandi County
Kreis Pernau